Brian Matthew Morris (born September 5, 1963) is an American attorney and judge who is the Chief United States district judge of the United States District Court for the District of Montana. He is a former Justice of the Montana Supreme Court, having been elected in 2004. Morris successfully retained his position in the 2012 election. He is also a former fullback for the Stanford Cardinal football team.

Early life and education

Born in Butte, Montana, to John and Joan Morris, Brian Morris graduated from Butte Central Catholic High School, where he was an All-State athlete, who competed in football, track, and basketball. As a senior in the 1981–1982 academic year, he led the football team to the 1981 state championship game and set school records by rushing 1,640 yards and making 236 carries for 1,732 total yards. In track, he was the 1982 state champion in both intermediate and high hurdles in the high school's first state championship in track.

Earning a scholarship to Stanford University, Morris was a four-year letterman on the Stanford Cardinal football team and was the team's starting fullback in the 1986 Gator Bowl. In the Gator Bowl, Morris made three carries for 12 rushing yards and made 3 receptions for 6 yards. In his junior and senior years, he was honorable mention all-Pacific-10 Conference and first team all-academic Pac-10. With 12 pass receptions against UCLA in 1985, Morris is one of the Cardinal's all-time single-game pass reception leaders. Morris earned his Bachelor of Arts in 1986 and his Master of Arts in 1987. As one of only eight students in the United States to earn the NCAA Post-Graduate Scholarship, Morris earned his Juris Doctor with distinction from Stanford Law School in 1992.

Career

After completing law school, Morris was a law clerk to Judge John T. Noonan, Jr. of the United States Court of Appeals for the Ninth Circuit and then to United States Supreme Court Chief Justice William Rehnquist. Morris is the only member of the Montana State Bar to have been a Supreme Court law clerk.

In 1995, he joined the Iran – United States Claims Tribunal at the World Court, The Hague, Netherlands, to be a legal assistant. Returning to Montana, Morris was in private practice in Bozeman from 1995 until 1999. He went on to be a legal officer at the United Nations Compensation Commission in Geneva, Switzerland.

Again returning to Montana in 2001, Morris was the Solicitor of the Department of Justice until Montana voters elected him to the Montana Supreme Court in November 2004.

Notable state court decisions

In 2009, Morris wrote the 6–1 decision in Kulstad v. Maniaci, in which the Court ruled in favor of a woman's right to joint custody rights of two children adopted by her same-sex partner during their relationship.

In 2010, he wrote the 4–1 decision in Wilson v. Montana that denying an inmate the use of a particular mental illness medication did not violate the criminal's rights.

Federal judicial service

On March 11, 2013, U.S. Senator Max Baucus announced that he would recommend that President Barack Obama nominate Morris to fill the vacancy on the United States District Court for the District of Montana caused by Judge Sam Haddon assuming senior status, the vacant seat being located in Great Falls. The recommendation was made after a number of candidates were considered by a nine-member Judicial Nominating Commission appointed by Senator Baucus and Senator Jon Tester. On May 23, 2013, President Obama formally nominated Morris to the judgeship. His nomination was reported to the floor by the United States Senate Judiciary Committee on September 19, 2013. Cloture was invoked on December 12, 2013 by a 57–40 vote. He was confirmed later that day by a 75–20 vote. He received his judicial commission on December 17, 2013. He became Chief Judge on March 19, 2020.

Notable rulings

In November 2018 Morris issued an order to stop the construction of the Keystone XL Pipeline so that further research could be done on its environmental effects. An appeal of this order was dismissed as moot and the Order was vacated by the Ninth Circuit Court of Appeals with instructions to dismiss the district court actions.

In July 2019 Morris issued an order overturning a rule issued by the Internal Revenue Service that allowed 501(c)(4) "social-welfare" organizations to shield the identities of their political donors. Subsequently the IRS has ended the reporting requirements for non-501(c)(3) organizations.

Personal life

Morris and his wife, Cherche Prezeau, have three sons and one daughter.

See also 
 List of law clerks of the Supreme Court of the United States (Chief Justice)

References

External links

1963 births
Living people
21st-century American judges
American football fullbacks
Judges of the United States District Court for the District of Montana
Law clerks of the Supreme Court of the United States
Montana lawyers
Justices of the Montana Supreme Court
Politicians from Butte, Montana
Players of American football from Montana
Stanford Cardinal football players
Stanford Law School alumni
United States district court judges appointed by Barack Obama